Zambales National High School is a Public school in Iba, Zambales, Philippines. It is one of the oldest secondary schools in the Philippines.

History
In 1913, Congressman Alejo Labrador initiated the move to put up a vocational school in the province.
The provincial government donated an eleven hectare farm where the school stands now, lending it the colloquial name of the Iba Farm School. A first two-story school building was constructed in R.M.M.S.A.T (R.M.P.C) school grounds (Old Site). The first school administrators were Americans. In 1918, the first batch of graduates emerged from the school. School Year 1917-1918 saw the first batch of graduates, all 19 boys were coming from various towns of the province

World War II
On December 8, 1941, Iba Air strip was bombed by Japanese warplanes prompting the school authorities to suspend classes. The students then were allowed to earn their degree despite non-completion of required days of schooling.  Those in the lower year were accelerated to the next higher year level. The school  was subsequently used as Japanese Headquarters. During the war, S.Y. 1941-1945, there were a total of 50 graduates ; 20 boys and 30 girls.

Enrollment
Zambales National High School has an estimated enrollment of 3,400 students. The school serves students from the municipalities of Iba, Botolan, Cabangan, Palauig, Masinloc, Candelaria and Santa Cruz. Some students rent in Boarding Houses and sometimes use school services and bus for transportation.

School buildings
 Gabaldon Building - it was constructed in 1928 on the land donated by the provincial government. The building is the home of the Principal Office, Guidance Counselor's Office, Record office, English Department, Filipino Department and TLE department.
 BL (Bagong Lipunan) Building - Built in 1979. The Math Department is in the building and sophomore students are based in this building. It is located behind Gabaldon Building.
 E.S.F (Economics Support Fund)- Built In 1985. It is for the new students and for the MAPEH Department.
 J.I.C.A  (Japanese International Cooperative Agency) - it is for the Junior High students. J.I.C.A is located near the Tacar River.
 D.T.B (Deloso Type) Building - Built in 1995, it was donated by Governor Deloso. It is the home for the Junior High students and is located at the back of BL Building.
 S.F (School of the Future BLDG.) - Donated by the late 2nd district congressman Antonio Diaz. Science Department has  this building. it was constructed in 1999.
 Sulong Zambales BLDG. - Donated by Gov. Hermogenes Ebdane, it was constructed in 2011. The AP Department holds office in this building. It is also home for the Sophomore students.
 I Love Zambales BLDG. -  Newly constructed building in the school Donated by Congresswoman Cheryl Deloso a 6-room building home for SPA students and Record and files Room

School newspapers

List of School Administrators
The List of Principal Through time and contributed in Zambales High.

References

http://www.bse.ph/index.php/ohsp.html
http://www.bse.ph/index.php/component/content/article/34-mandate/162-spj.html
http://www.bse.ph/index.php/component/content/article/34-mandate/163-sps.html
http://www.bse.ph/index.php/component/content/article/34-mandate/164-spa.html
http://www.zambalesnhs.webs.com/History.html

External links
Zambales National High School

Educational institutions established in 1913
High schools in Zambales
1913 establishments in the Philippines